WTA Premier Tournaments was a category of tennis tournaments in the Women's Tennis Association tour, implemented from the reorganization of the schedule in 2009 until 2020.

In 2020, Premier events included:
 Four "Premier Mandatory" events in Indian Wells, Miami, Madrid, and Beijing with prize money of $4.5 million.
 Five "Premier 5" events in Doha, Rome, Cincinnati, Toronto/Montreal, and Wuhan with prize money of $2 million.
 Twelve "Premier" events with prize money of $600,000 to $1,000,000.

The ranking points awarded to the winners of these tournaments are:
 "Premier Mandatory" 1000
 "Premier 5" 900 and
 "Premier" 470.
This compares to 2,000 points for winning a Grand Slam Tournament ("major"), up to 1,500 points for winning the WTA Finals, and 280 for winning an International tournament. This system differs from that used for the men's ATP rankings, but only slightly. The men have nine Masters events with 1,000 points for the winner (akin to WTA Premier Mandatory and Premier 5 tournaments), and the next two tiers of ATP tournaments offer 500 and 250 points for winning respectively.

Events

Singles results

2009

2010

2011

2012

2013

2014

2015

2016

2017

2018

2019

2020

Singles champions

Premier Mandatory

Premier 5

Premier

Singles titles
These tables present the number of singles WTA Premier titles won by each player and each nation since 2009.

Titles won by player

Titles won by nation

See also
 WTA 1000 tournaments
 WTA 500 tournaments
 WTA 250 tournaments
 ATP World Tour Masters 1000

References

External links
 2009 Sony Ericsson WTA Tour Calendar
  Sony Ericsson WTA Tour Announces Landmark 2009 Roadmap Calendar

WTA Premier tournaments